ATS or Ats may refer to:

Businesses
 ATS Wheels, or Auto Technisches Spezialzubehör, a German wheel manufacturer and sponsor of a Formula One racing team
 ATS Automation Tooling Systems, an Ontario, Canada-based factory automation company
 ATS Euromaster, a European tyre service supplier
 Automobili Turismo e Sport, an Italian automotive manufacturer from 1962 to 1965

Economics and finance
 Alternative trading system, SEC classification in US equity trading
 Austrian schilling, former currency of Austria (ISO 4217 currency code ATS)
 Automated trading system, a computer program that creates and submits orders to a financial exchange

Government and law

Laws
 Alien Tort Statute, a US law

Military and law enforcement
 Anti-Terrorism Squad
 Special Tactics Group, New Zealand, formerly Anti-Terrorist Squad
 Auxiliary Territorial Service, World War II women's branch of the British Army
 Boeing Airpower Teaming System, a stealth unmanned aerial vehicle in development by Boeing Australia

Treaties
 Antarctic Treaty System, or the associated Antarctic Treaty Secretariat
 Australian Treaty Series

Organizations

In education
 Ai Tong School, a primary school in Singapore
 Asian Theological Seminary, seminary in the Philippines
 Association of Theological Schools in the United States and Canada
 Association of Trust Schools, in Zimbabwe
 Automate the Schools, school administration system in New York City, US

Other organizations
 Adventist Theological Society, a nonprofit organization of Seventh-day Adventists
 Swiss Telegraphic Agency (Agence télégraphique suisse), a non-profit press agency of Switzerland
 American Temperance Society, a former US organization
 American Thoracic Society, a medical society
 Antique Telescope Society

Technology

In software and computing
 Apache Traffic Server
 IBM Administrative Terminal System (ATS/360)
 Applicant tracking system, recruitment software
 ATS (programming language)
 Automated Targeting System, used to identify entrants to the US who may be criminals
 Automated trading system, a computer program that creates and submits orders to a financial exchange
 American Truck Simulator, a 2016 vehicle simulation video game developed by SCS Software

Other technologies
 Aerobic treatment system, for sewage
 Air traffic service, a service which regulates and assists aircraft in real-time to ensure their safe operations
 Airport Transit System, a U.S. rail system at Chicago O'Hare International Airport, Illinois
 Ammonium thiosulfate
 Applications Technology Satellite, an experimental fleet of satellites launched by NASA
 Automatic train stop, a system that stops a train in certain situations to prevent accidents
 Automatic train supervision, a module within CBTC
 Automatic transfer switch, which switches an electricity supply to a standby source
 Boeing Airpower Teaming System, also called Loyal Wingman, is an Australian unmanned aircraft which incorporates artificial intelligence and utilises a modular mission package system.

Other uses
 Cadillac ATS, a car model produced by Cadillac
 "Against the spread", in betting
 Alberta Township System, a land surveying system used in Western Canada
 Amphetamine transdermal system
 Ats (given name)
 A Thousand Suns, 2010 album by Linkin Park